The 1990 Hungarian Grand Prix was a Formula One motor race held at Hungaroring on 12 August 1990. It was the tenth race of the 1990 Formula One World Championship. The race was the sixth Hungarian Grand Prix and the fifth to be held at the Hungaroring.

Belgian driver Thierry Boutsen, driving a Williams-Renault, took his third and final Grand Prix win after leading the entire race. Ayrton Senna, driving a McLaren-Honda, finished less than 0.3 seconds behind Boutsen, having survived a collision with the Benetton-Ford of Alessandro Nannini. Nannini's teammate Nelson Piquet finished third. , this is the most recent victory in Formula One for a driver competing under the Belgian flag.

With rival Alain Prost failing to finish, Senna increased his lead in the Drivers' Championship over the Frenchman.

Pre-race
In the run-up to the race, Camel announced that it was ending its sponsorship of Lotus at the end of 1990 and would be sponsoring Williams and Benetton in 1991.

Qualifying

Pre-qualifying report
As at the previous event in Germany, the Ligier drivers were first and second in the Friday morning pre-qualifying session. The positions were reversed, however, with Nicola Larini outpacing team-mate Philippe Alliot. The other two pre-qualifiers were the AGS cars, driven by Yannick Dalmas in third, and Gabriele Tarquini in fourth, the pair nearly two seconds slower than the Ligiers. It was the first time since the French Grand Prix that both AGS cars had pre-qualified, and only the second time this season.

Also for only the second time this season, Olivier Grouillard failed to pre-qualify in the Osella, as he was fifth fastest, less than two tenths of a second slower than Tarquini. There was a big improvement from Bertrand Gachot in the Coloni, now seeing the benefits of the Cosworth DFR engine in place of the Subaru, as he was sixth fastest, just 0.264 seconds behind Tarquini. The EuroBruns were seventh and eighth, Roberto Moreno a couple of seconds faster than Claudio Langes, and bottom of the time sheets as usual was Bruno Giacomelli in the Life, missing the cut by a very wide margin. On this occasion the L190 managed five laps before the engine expired.

Pre-qualifying classification

Qualifying report
On the tight and twisty Hungaroring, the two Williams filled the front row with Thierry Boutsen 0.036 seconds ahead of Riccardo Patrese. This was to be the only pole position of Boutsen's career. Gerhard Berger was third ahead of McLaren teammate Ayrton Senna, while Senna's Drivers' Championship rival Alain Prost could only manage eighth, behind Ferrari teammate Nigel Mansell, Jean Alesi in the Tyrrell and Alessandro Nannini in the Benetton. The top ten was completed by Nelson Piquet in the second Benetton and Andrea de Cesaris in the Dallara.

Qualifying classification

Race

Race report
At the start, Boutsen led away while Berger moved ahead of Patrese. Mansell and Alesi both passed Senna at the first corner, while de Cesaris shot past both Benettons and Prost. The top four started to pull away, while Alesi held up the cars behind him.

Nannini soon re-passed de Cesaris, but the Dallara driver kept ahead of Piquet and Prost before retiring on lap 23 with an engine failure. Senna passed Alesi on lap 21, only to suffer a puncture which dropped him to tenth. Nannini passed the Tyrrell driver shortly afterwards and quickly caught up to the top four, followed by Prost. On lap 36, Alesi collided with the Minardi of Pierluigi Martini, putting them both out; Prost retired at around the same time with a gearbox failure.

At the halfway point of the race, the top five remained Boutsen, Berger, Patrese, Mansell and Nannini, with Senna back up to sixth and closing fast. He moved ahead of teammate Berger when the Austrian pitted for new tyres. On lap 52 Mansell made an attempt to pass Patrese, only to fall behind Nannini and Senna. Patrese pitted a few laps later, falling to seventh behind Berger and Piquet.

On lap 64, Senna attempted to pass Nannini at the chicane. The two collided, putting the Benetton driver out. Then on lap 72, Berger attempted a similar move on Mansell, taking both drivers out. This left Boutsen and Senna nearly half a minute clear of Piquet. Senna tried to find a way past Boutsen, but the Belgian held him off, crossing the line 0.288 seconds ahead. Boutsen would later claim that if the race had continued for any longer his brakes would likely have failed. Piquet finished four seconds ahead of Patrese, with Derek Warwick in the Lotus and Éric Bernard in the Larrousse-Lola completing the top six.

Senna increased his lead over Prost in the Drivers' Championship to ten points, 54 to 44, with Berger on 29 and Boutsen on 27. McLaren also increased their lead in the Constructors' Championship, with 83 points to Ferrari's 57, followed by Williams on 42 and Benetton on 35.

Race classification

Championship standings after the race

Drivers' Championship standings

Constructors' Championship standings

 Note: Only the top five positions are included for both sets of standings.

References

Hungarian Grand Prix
Hungarian Grand Prix
Grand Prix
August 1990 sports events in Europe